Taishan, alternately romanized in Cantonese as Toishan or Toisan, in local dialect as Hoisan, and formerly known as Xinning or Sunning, is a county-level city in the southwest of Guangdong province, China. It is administered as part of the prefecture-level city of Jiangmen. During the 2020 census, there were 907,354 inhabitants (941,095 in 2010), but only 433,266 were considered urban. Taishan calls itself the "First Home of the Overseas Chinese". An estimated half a million Chinese Americans are of Taishanese descent.

Geography
Taishan is located in the Pearl River Delta in southwestern  Jiangmen Prefecture. It includes 95 islands and islets, including Shangchuan Island, the largest island in Guangdong now that Hainan has become a separate province. Taishan is one of Guangdong's "Four Counties" (Sze Yup), which excluded Heshan and is now part of the Greater Taishan Region.

Climate

History
During the Ming dynasty, the area of present-day Taishan was carved out of Xinhui County on 12 February 1499 as "Xinning County." By the 19th century, Xinning was already a source of migrant and emigrant workers, but a series of subsequent natural and political disasters in the area exacerbated the situation. Aside from the disruption of the Sea Ban regulations (Haijin) themselves, their revocation led to an influx of northern settlers who began long-running feuds with the returning locals; this erupted into full-scale war in the 1850s and '60s. The 1842 Treaty of Nanking that ended the First Opium War opened China to greater foreign trade just before the California Gold Rush made the prospect of emigration to the United States appealing. Many also served as contract workers abroad, as in Hawaii and Cuba and—most famously—for the Central Pacific half of America's Transcontinental Railroad, where the Chinese made up 80% of the company's workforce as they laid track over the mountains and deserts of the west. By 1870, there were 63,000 Chinese in the United States, almost all in California.

Chin Gee Hee's Sun Ning Railway Company connected Sun Ning (Xinning) with its hinterland in 1908 and reached Jiangmen (Kongmoon) in 1913. It was notable as one of only three railways financed, built, owned, and run by the Chinese themselves before the 1949 Communist victory in the Chinese Civil War.

In 1914, the new Republican government renamed the area Taishan County to avoid confusion with other places named Xinning. (It is now, however, frequently confused in foreign sources with Mount Tai in Shandong.) During the Second World War, the Sun Ning Railway was destroyed to prevent its use by the Japanese. Japanese soldiers entered Taicheng, the county seat, in March 1941 and killed nearly 280 people. One quarter of the "Flying Tigers", a joint American and Chinese group of airmen who fought the Japanese before the United States entered the Second World War, hailed from Taishan.

Taishan was promoted to county-level city status on 17 April 1992, reflecting its increasing level of urbanization.

Administration

Taishan administers 1 subdistrict and 16 towns, which in turn are subdivided into 313 administrative villages, and residential communities. The city has 3,655 natural villages, although they do not function as administrative divisions.

Taishan's township-level divisions are:

Some of the city's natural villages include Annanjiangchao, Bihou, Jilong, and Guanbuli.

Demographics
If considering the total Greater Taishan Region or Sze Yap Region, which includes Kaiping, Xinhui, Enping and Taishan, there are about 8 to 9 million Taishanese people worldwide. According to American historian Him Mark Lai, approximately 430,000 or 70% of Chinese Americans in the 1980s were Taishanese according to 1988 data. Currently some 500,000 Chinese Americans claim Taishanese origins.

While Taishan itself has a population of about 1 million, there are around 1.3 million Taishanese people overseas, distributed in 91 countries and regions. It is estimated that, up to the mid- to late-20th century, over 75% of all overseas Chinese in North America claimed origin in Taishan, so Taishan has been named the "Home of Overseas Chinese."

Language
The main dialect of Taishan is Taishanese. While most Taishanese today use Mandarin in school or formal occasions, Taishanese is the de facto language. Schools require their students to speak Mandarin in the classroom, and teachers are required to lecture in Mandarin.

Taishanese is a language of the Yue Chinese, a large group which includes, but is broader than, the Cantonese spoken in Hong Kong and Guangzhou. Thus Cantonese and Taishanese are related but distinct. Cantonese is also widely known in Taishan, as it serves as the lingua franca of Guangdong Province.

Before the 1980s, Taishanese was the predominant Chinese language spoken throughout North America's Chinatowns.

Economy 
In 2018, the city's GDP reached 43.25 billion Yuan, government revenue was 2.92 billion Yuan, fixed-asset investment was 27.33 billion Yuan, retail sales totaled 25.52 billion Yuan, and foreign trade totaled 13.76 billion Yuan.

Power Generation 
The city is home to two major power plants: the Guohua Taishan Power Station and the Taishan Nuclear Power Plant.

Culture

Sports 
Taishan is nicknamed the "hometown of volleyball", after the game was introduced to the city in 1915 by Lingnan University student Wu Xiumin. Many prominent Chinese volleyball players have subsequently hailed from Taishan. In recent years, local governments in the city have invested in the area's volleyball programs, and the city hosted a number of Volleyball Women's Nations League matches in 2018. 9-man is a form of volleyball from Taishan brought to American Chinatowns by Taishanese immigrants.

Music and Entertainment 
Taishan and Guangzhou are the birthplaces of Guangdong music.

Parts of the movie Let the Bullets Fly were filmed in Taishan in 2010.

Education
Education enjoys significant support from Overseas Chinese professionals and businessmen. Many secondary schools were built and financed by Chinese living in China's Special Administrative Regions, as well as various foreign countries, such as the United States, Canada, and Brazil. To honor their benefactors, these schools often bear either their names or the names of said donor's parents.

For example, the Peng Quan School is a prime example, which was constructed during 1999–2001, and is now integrated into Taishan's public school system. It is situated on the west side of Taicheng, and was built by a Hong Kong businessman.

There are many middle schools and high schools in Taishan, but no academic universities. Students must study rigorously in order to be accepted at universities located in other cities.

Taishan schools include:

University:
 Taishan Panshi Television University

Secondary schools (including combined junior-senior high schools and senior high schools):

 Taishan No. 1 High School
 Taishan Overseas Chinese Middle School
 Taishan Peiying Vocational Technical School
 Taishan Taishi Senior High School
 Taishan City Peng Quan School
 Taishan Litan Gengkai Memorial Middle School
 Taishan Peizheng School
 Taishan Renyuan Middle School
 Taishan Guang Hai School
 Taishan Shuibu Middle School
 Taishan Lishufen Memorial Middle School
 Taishan Chonglou Middle School
 Taishan Xueye Junior Middle School
 Taishan Xinning Middle School
 Taishan Yizhong Dajiang Experimental Middle School
 Taishan Najin Middle School
 Taishan Ningyang Middle School

Transportation

Taishan is accessible by bus with a long-distance bus station in Taicheng, and through a port at GongYi on the Tan River which flows into the Pearl River Delta. The ferry service between GongYi and Hong Kong has been discontinued.

Ferry 
Ferry services connect the island of Shangchuan with the mainland, sailing between the Sanzhou Harbor on Shangchuan, and Shanzui Harbor in the town of Chuandao. There are also daily ferry services between Sanzhou Harbor and the nearby island of Xiachuan.

Rail 
In 2018, the Taishan railway station opened in Taicheng Subdistrict, connecting the city via rail.

Notes

References

External links

 China Taishan Web
 Taishan City Government
 Chinese Genealogy
 Map of Taishan
 Hoisanese to English Dictionary
 Taishan Culture & Loisirs (Association of the Taishan expatriate community)

 
1499 establishments in Asia
15th-century establishments in China
Populated places established in the 1490s
Jiangmen
County-level cities in Guangdong
Siyi